Hisham Sharaf Abdullah (born 1956) is a Yemeni civil engineer and politician who has served in several cabinet posts. He is currently Yemen's minister of foreign  affairs, and formerly the minister of higher education and scientific research.

Early life and education
Abdullah was born in Taiz in 1956. He holds a civil engineering degree, which he received from Pennsylvania State University in 1983. He obtained a master's degree in project administration with a minor in computer science from the Catholic University of America in 1988.

Career
Sharaf served as deputy minister for international planning and co-operation until early 2011. In January 2011, he was named the minister of industry and trade, replacing Yahya Al Mutawakil in the post. On 7 December 2011, Sharaf was appointed minister of oil and natural mineral resources in the unity government led by Prime Minister Muhammad Salim Basindwah. Saadeddin bin Taleb succeeded him as minister of industry and trade. On 11 September 2012, Sharaf was appointed minister of higher education and scientific research in a cabinet reshuffle, succeeding Yahia Al Shoaibi. His deputy Ahmed Abdullah Daress replaced Sharaf as oil minister.

Personal life
Sharaf is married and has three children.

See also
List of foreign ministers in 2017
List of current foreign ministers

References

External links

 

1956 births
Catholic University of America alumni
Living people
Penn State College of Engineering alumni
People from Taiz
Oil and mineral ministers of Yemen
Industry and trade ministers of Yemen
Higher education ministers of Yemen
21st-century Yemeni politicians